1995–96 Bosnia and Herzegovina Football Cup was the second season of the Bosnia and Herzegovina's annual football cup. The Cup was won by Čelik Zenica who defeated Sloboda Tuzla in the final.

Quarterfinals
The matches were played on 10 April 1996.

|}

Semifinals
The matches were played on 15 May 1996.

|}

Final

See also
 1995–96 First League of Bosnia and Herzegovina

External links
Statistics on RSSSF
SportSport.ba forum

Bosnia and Herzegovina Football Cup seasons
Cup
Bosnia